The Nokia 700  is an ultra slim smartphone running Nokia Belle (Symbian OS 10.1). It was announced on 24 August 2011 and released in September 2011. Nokia claimed it was their "greenest smartphone to date".

A Nokia Belle update (Feature Pack 1) increased the 700's processor speed from 1.0 GHz to 1.3 GHz, increased personalisation options with 20 new and improved homescreen widgets, and added a faster browser with HTML 5 support.

With Nokia Belle Feature Pack 1, the full Microsoft Office Mobile app also became available for installation.

The phone features USB, Bluetooth, Wi-Fi, NFC with a 640×360 px (nHD), 3.2" capacitive, multi-touch AMOLED display with Nokia ClearBlack technology and Corning Gorilla Glass. It has a mass of 96 g (3.4 oz) and its rear camera is 5 megapixels (2592 х 1944 pixels), fixed focus, 16:9 720p video, 30 FPS.

References

External links 

Nokia smartphones
Symbian devices